A Magical Gathering: The Clannad Anthology is a greatest hits compilation album by Clannad, released by Rhino Records in 2002. With performances in English and Gaelic, Rhino’s two-disc release is the first-ever career-spanning collection from the group. With 34 tracks released between 1973 and 1998, it includes signature songs like "Theme from Harry's Game" and "In a Lifetime".

Track listing

CD 1
 "Níl Sé'n Lá" – 5:02
 "Thíos Cois na Trá Domh" – 3:07
 "Teidhir Abhaile Riú" – 2:48
 "Fairly Shot of Her" – 2:20
 "Dúlamán" – 4:26
 "The Galtee Hunt" – 3:10
 "Siúil A Rúin" – 5:48
 "Bruach na Carraige Báine" – 2:37
 "An tÚll" – 3:06
 "Coinleach Ghlas an Fhómhair" – 5:58
 "Thíos Fán Chósta" – 3:16
 "Theme from Harry's Game" – 3:40
 "Newgrange" – 4:05

CD 2
 "Robin (The Hooded Man)" – 2:49
 "Now Is Here" – 3:07
 "Ancient Forest" – 2:59
 "Caisleán Óir" – 2:09
 "In a Lifetime" (featuring Bono) – 3:06
 "Almost Seems (Too Late to Turn)" – 4:51
 "Buachaill Ón Éirne" – 3:10
 "Second Nature" – 3:21
 "Something to Believe In" (featuring Bruce Hornsby) – 4:48
 "Sirius" – 3:34
 "Rí na Cruinne" – 3:58
 "The Poison Glen" – 3:56
 "I Will Find You" – 5:06
 "Banba Óir" – 3:27
 "Seanchas" – 4:56
 "Croí Cróga" – 5:01
 "An Gleann" – 4:51
 "A Mhuirnín Ó" – 4:59
 "I Will Find You" – 1:48

2002 greatest hits albums
Clannad compilation albums